Konga is a Swedish locality.

Konga may also refer to:
Garuda Contingent, the Indonesian peacekeeping contingent
Konga.com, a Nigerian company that launched in 2012
Konga (film), a 1961 British science fiction film
King Konga/Konga the Barbarian, early stage names for professional wrestler The Barbarian (born 1958)

See also
Clement Wani Konga, Governor of Central Equatoria from 2005 to 2015
Conga (disambiguation)
Donkey Konga, a GameCube rhythm video game 
Konga Yo, a 1962 French adventure film
Kongu (disambiguation)
Pauline Konga, a retired Kenyan long-distance runner
Pitcho Womba Konga, a Congolese-Belgian actor